John W. Coughlin (June 9, 1861 – December 2, 1920) was an American physician and politician who served as Mayor of Fall River, Massachusetts.

Coughlin was born in Fall River on June 9, 1861, to William and Abbie Coughlin.

Coughlin studied medicine at the College of Physicians and Surgeons in Baltimore, Maryland.

Coughlin was elected Mayor of Fall River in 1890.

Coughlin represented Massachusetts' thirteenth Congressional District at the 1892 Democratic National Convention.

Coughlin died in Fall River on December 2, 1920.

Notes

External links
Testimony of John W. Coughlin in the Trial of Lizzie Borden June 14, 1893

1861 births
1920 deaths
Mayors of Fall River, Massachusetts
1892 United States presidential election